Parliamentary elections were held in the Nagorno-Karabakh Republic on 23 May 2010.

Background
Nagorno-Karabakh declared its independence from Azerbaijan in 1991. The First Nagorno-Karabakh War took place between 1988 and 1994 which resulted in Nagorno-Karabakh, with Armenian support, becoming de facto independent from Azerbaijan. However it has not been internationally recognised and Azerbaijan still claims the area as part of its state.

Several changes to the election process were made since the previous election in 2005. Whereas previously, 22 of the parliament's 33 seats were filled using party-list proportional representation and 11 using first-past-the-post, the distribution for these elections is 17–16. Another change concerns the lowering of the election threshold from 10% to 6% (for political parties) and from 15% to 8% (for electoral blocs).

A total of 94,900 voters are registered for the election, about 66% of the total population of Nagorno-Karabakh.

Contesting parties
Before the elections, it became clear very few opposition parties would contest. Four parties contesting the 17 list-based seats are registered: Free Motherland (FM), led by Prime Minister Arayik Harutyunyan, the Democratic Party of Artsakh (DPA), the Armenian Revolutionary Federation (ARM) and the Communist Party of Artsakh (CPA). Of these parties, only the communists did not support president Bako Sahakyan in the 2007 election. 44 More candidates stand for election in the 16 FPTP constituencies.

Opinion polls

Results
With about 50% of the votes counted, Free Motherland led the count with 45.8% of the votes. The DPA was at 30.7% and the ARF at 18.2%. The CP was below the electoral threshold of 6% (5.34%), which means it might be difficult for them to get a seat.

The Communist Party failed to cross the electoral threshold and did not win any seats.

Reactions
About 120 international observers from France, Russia, USA, Italy, Germany, Greece, Great Britain, Argentina, Ireland, Czech Republic, Denmark, Iran, Netherlands, Canada, Slovakia, South Ossetia, Abkhazia, Transnistria, and others, as well as a big group of observers from Armenia observed the elections. Later the Iranian foreign ministry spokesperson Ramin Mehmanparast stated that Iran had not delegated any observers. Azerbaijan made a black list of the international observers who visited Nagorno-Karabakh and declared them personae non-gratae.

Various international organisations and countries issued statements refusing to recognise the 2010 elections in Nagorno-Karabakh, among them the Organization for Security and Co-operation in Europe, the European Union, the United Kingdom, France, Iran, Russia, Turkey, and Lithuania.

References

Parliamentary
Elections in the Republic of Artsakh
Nagorno-Karabakh
Nagorno-Karabakh
Election and referendum articles with incomplete results